Miki Sudo (born ) is an American competitive eater. She won the women's competition at the Nathan's Hot Dog Eating Contest every year from 2014 to 2020, unseating Sonya Thomas, who had won the women's competition since its inception in 2011. She captured her eighth title in 2022.

Early life
Sudo was born to a European American mother and Japanese father.  At the age of five, she moved to Japan with her family and lived there for seven years before returning to the United States.

Competitive eating career
Sudo entered the competitive eating circuit in 2013, winning a pho eating contest. In 2014 she became Major League Eating's top ranked female competitive eater, and in 2015 reached the top three overall. She is ranked 3rd in the world with Major League Eating as of 2022, and holds 4 world records in Kimchi, Hotdish, ice cream, and the women's record for hot dogs.

Nathan's Famous Hot Dog Eating Contest results

Other achievements

Personal life
Sudo has been in a relationship with fellow competitive eater Nick Wehry since 2018. In January 2021, the couple announced they were expecting their first child; as a result, Sudo skipped the 2021 Nathan's Hot Dog Eating Contest, but served as a commentator for the event on ESPN.

See also
 List of competitive eaters

References

Living people
American competitive eaters
American people of Japanese descent
University of Nevada, Las Vegas alumni
Year of birth missing (living people)